"Good Day" is a song released and performed by the British rock band, The Kinks. The song, written by Ray Davies, appeared on the band's album, Word of Mouth.

Background

During the sessions for "Good Day," a drum machine was used instead of drummer Mick Avory, due to the conflicts between Avory and Dave Davies. Ray Davies said of this:

Release

"Good Day" was first released as a single in Britain (as well as Denmark, the Netherlands, Norway, and Sweden) in August 1984, backed with "Too Hot" (both songs would appear on Word of Mouth.) A maxi-single, with "Don't Forget to Dance" added to the two tracks already on the 7 inch single, was also released in the UK. "Good Day", however, was unsuccessful, as it did not chart in any country. In November of that year, "Good Day" appeared as the third track on the first side of The Kinks' album, Word of Mouth. Word of Mouth was a modest success in America (hitting #57), but the album did not achieve the Top 20 success that its predecessors State of Confusion, Give the People What They Want, and Low Budget had.

An extended edit of "Good Day" appears as a bonus track on some CD reissues of Word of Mouth.

Reception

"Good Day", despite its commercial failures, has received generally positive feedback from critics. AllMusic'''s Stephen Thomas Erlewine cited the track as a highlight from the Word of Mouth disc of the compilation album, The Arista Years (which is a box set of all Kinks albums released on the Arista label) despite not doing so in his review of Word of Mouth. Rolling Stone'' writer David Fricke said that, "for 'Good Day,' Ray dusts off his old 'Sunny Afternoon' ennui with a languid melody and a fragile, winning chorus."

References

The Kinks songs
1984 singles
Songs written by Ray Davies
Song recordings produced by Ray Davies
1984 songs
Arista Records singles